Derailed is a 2005 American crime thriller film based on the novel of the same name by James Siegel. The film was directed by Mikael Håfström and stars Clive Owen, Jennifer Aniston, Vincent Cassel, Giancarlo Esposito, David Morrissey, RZA and Xzibit. The story is based on the Badger Game con. This was the first film to be released by The Weinstein Company in the United States.

Plot 
Chicago advertising executive Charles Schine lives with his wife Deanna and their daughter Amy, who suffers from type 1 diabetes, which requires expensive medication.

On a commuter train to work one morning, Charles meets Lucinda Harris, a financial advisor who is also married with a daughter. A mutual attraction develops and the two begin meeting frequently. They soon decide to consummate their affair in a run-down hotel. As Lucinda is unzipping Charles' pants, they are interrupted by an armed man who beats Charles and brutally rapes Lucinda. Not wanting their spouses to learn of their affair, Charles and Lucinda agree not to report the crime and then go their separate ways.

Days later, the man, who identifies himself as Philippe LaRoche, contacts Charles and threatens to kill his family if he does not pay him $20,000. A month later, LaRoche calls again, this time demanding $100,000. Charles explains his situation to his work colleague Winston, an ex-con who works as a repairman in his building. Winston offers to scare off LaRoche for ten percentage of the payout. Charles embezzles $10,000 from his company and he and Winston plot to get the drop on LaRoche at his specified meeting location. However, LaRoche surprises him, shoots Winston dead and takes the money. Charles disposes of Winston's body and gives a false alibi when questioned by Detective Franklin Church.

Charles later receives a call from LaRoche; he is holding Lucinda hostage and will kill her if he does not deliver the $100,000. Charles takes the money from an account meant for his daughter's medical treatment and makes the payoff to LaRoche and his partner Dexter. Charles then visits Lucinda at work and discovers she is actually called Jane, who worked there briefly as a temp. He goes to Jane's apartment, which is being shown to prospective renters, and finds that Jane's photograph of her supposed daughter is actually a cut-out of a stock picture from a brochure.

Charles tracks Jane down and sees her kissing LaRoche, learning she was in on the scam. He also observes her seducing another unsuspecting businessman, Sam. Charles rents a room at the same hotel as before and waits for Jane to go there with Sam. Determined to retrieve his stolen money, Charles knocks LaRoche unconscious outside the hotel room door, disarms him, and reveals to Sam the scheme he has been set up for. Dexter arrives to back up LaRoche and a gunfight ensues; nearly everyone is fatally shot but Charles, who returns to his room and convinces the police he was just a bystander. Before leaving, Charles claims his briefcase and gets back the money.

Later, Charles is suspended from work for the embezzlement and is sentenced to six months of community service, teaching in a prison. During one of his classes, he comes across a notebook containing a story about him written by one of the students. Charles finds LaRoche, who had survived the gunfight. LaRoche threatens to continue to disrupt Charles' life but Charles reveals that he has planned their encounter and then stabs LaRoche to death with a shank.

Charles walks away from the encounter by claiming to Detective Church that LaRoche attacked him and he reacted in self-defence. He returns to his family.

Cast 
Clive Owen as Charles Schine
Jennifer Aniston as Jane ("Lucinda Harris")
Vincent Cassel as Philippe LaRoche
Melissa George as Deanna Schine
Giancarlo Esposito as Detective Franklin Church
RZA as Winston Boyko
Xzibit as Dexter
Addison Timlin as Amy Schine
Tom Conti as Eliot Firth
Rachael Blake as Susan Davis
Denis O'Hare as Jerry the Lawyer
Georgina Chapman as Candy
David Morrissey as Sam Griffin
David Oyelowo as Patrol Officer
Danny McCarthy as Correctional Officer Hank
Ortis Deley as Cop
Richard Leaf as Night Clerk Ray
Catherine McCord as Avery Price Receptionist

Reception

Box office 
Derailed opened in 2,443 theaters for an opening weekend gross of $12,211,986. The film made a domestic gross of $36,024,076 and an international gross of $21,455,000, giving it a worldwide gross of $57,479,076.

Critical response 
The critical consensus states "With miscast stars, a ludicrous plot and an obvious twist, Derailed embodies its name all too aptly." The film also has a score of 40 out of 100 on Metacritic based on 34 critics indicating "mixed or average reviews".

Roger Ebert of the Chicago Sun-Times awarded the film two and a half out of four stars and believed that Owen's and Aniston's performances were intriguing. Ebert said, "Clive Owen was my candidate for James Bond, and can play hard and heartless rotters (see Closer), but here he is quiet and sad, with a sort of passivity. He lets his face relax into acceptance of his own bad fortune. Jennifer Aniston does that interesting thing of not being a stereotyped sexpot but being irresistibly intriguing. That works with a man like Charles. Happily married, in debt, worried about his daughter and his job, he would be impervious to a sexy slut."

Soundtrack

Additional music by

Remakes 
In 2006, Tamil movie starring Jyothika and Sarath Kumar, named Pachaikili Muthucharam was adapted from the book.
The film was remade in Hindi as The Train and a Sinhala film adaptation titled Dakina Dakina Mal.

In 2010, the film was remade in Ghana by filmmaker Frank Rajah Arase as Temptation. It stars Majid Michel and Frank Artus

See also 
List of films featuring diabetes
List of American films of 2005

References

External links 

2005 films
2005 crime thriller films
2005 psychological thriller films
American crime thriller films
American neo-noir films
American thriller drama films
British crime thriller films
British thriller drama films
Di Bonaventura Pictures films
Films distributed by Disney
Films about families
Films based on American novels
Films based on crime novels
Films based on thriller novels
Films directed by Mikael Håfström
Films produced by Lorenzo di Bonaventura
Films set in Chicago
Films scored by Edward Shearmur
Films shot at Elstree Film Studios
Films shot in Chicago
Films with screenplays by Stuart Beattie
Miramax films
Rail transport films
The Weinstein Company films
2000s English-language films
2000s American films
2000s British films